Çevreyolu is a light-rail station on the Karşıyaka Tram line of the Tram İzmir network. The station consists of two side platforms serving two tracks. Çevreyolu is located on 8291st Street, just off of Caher Dudayev Boulevard, in Ataşehir, Çiğli and gets its name from the O-30 beltway running just north of the station. Çevreyolu station was opened on 11 April 2017, along with the entire tram line.

Connections
ESHOT operates city bus service on Caher Dudayev Boulevard.

References

External links
Tram İzmir - official website

Railway stations opened in 2017
2017 establishments in Turkey
Çiğli District
Tram transport in İzmir